Peter Francis Welch (born May 2, 1947) is an American lawyer and politician serving as the junior United States senator from Vermont since 2023. He has been a major figure in Vermont politics for over four decades, and is only the second Democrat to be elected a U.S. senator from the state.

Welch served in the Vermont Senate from 1981 to 1989, including terms as minority leader. He was the Senate's president pro tempore from 1985 to 1989, the first Democrat to hold the position. In 1988, he gave up his seat to run for the United States House of Representatives and lost the Democratic primary to Paul N. Poirier. He was the Democratic nominee for governor of Vermont in 1990, losing the general election to Republican Richard A. Snelling.

Welch continued to practice law and returned to politics in 2001, when he was appointed to fill a vacancy in the Vermont Senate. He was re-elected in 2002 and 2004 and served as Senate president from 2003 to 2007. In 2006, Welch was elected to the U.S. House of Representatives, succeeding Bernie Sanders, who was elected to the United States Senate. In November 2021, Welch announced his candidacy for the Democratic nomination in the 2022 United States Senate election in Vermont to succeed retiring Senator Patrick Leahy. On August 9, 2022, he won the Democratic primary. On November 8, 2022, Welch won the general election, defeating Republican nominee Gerald Malloy. Elected at age 75, he is the oldest person to become a freshman senator, a record previously held by Frederick Gillett.

Early life, education, and career
Welch was born in Springfield, Massachusetts, in 1947, where he attended local Catholic schools (Holy Name Grammar School and Cathedral High School). He graduated magna cum laude from College of the Holy Cross in 1969 and in 1973 earned a J.D. degree from Boalt Hall, the law school of the University of California, Berkeley.

Welch "worked with low-income people on Chicago's West Side in the late 1960s" as a community organizer. He worked for an organization that was affiliated with the Southern Christian Leadership Conference, and its activities included attendance at an SCLC national convention in Atlanta. Participants there strategized and heard remarks from Ralph Abernathy, Hosea Williams, and Martin Luther King Jr.

Welch worked for Lloyd Cutler, who later served as White House Counsel during the administrations of presidents Jimmy Carter and Bill Clinton, at a Washington law firm.

After graduating from law school, Welch moved to Vermont in 1973. He served as a law clerk for Judge Henry Black of the Vermont Superior Court. He worked for several years as a public defender for low-income clients in Windsor County and Orange County. Welch was a partner for 30 years in the personal injury law firm Welch, Graham & Manby in White River Junction, Vermont.

Vermont government
In 1980, Welch was elected to the Vermont Senate from Windsor County. In his second term, Welch was chosen as the Minority Leader, and he became president pro tempore after Democrats gained control of the Senate. Welch was the first Democrat to serve as Vermont's senate president, since Vermont was a bastion for the Whigs and then the Republicans for more than 100 years beginning in the 1830s.

In 1988, Welch left the Vermont Senate to make an unsuccessful run for the Democratic nomination for the U.S. House of Representatives.

In 1990, Welch won the Democratic nomination for governor of Vermont but lost the general election to Republican Richard Snelling.

Welch did not run for another office for more than a decade; in 2001, Governor Howard Dean appointed him to fill a vacant Vermont Senate seat in Windsor County. He was elected to the seat in 2002 and reelected in 2004, again serving as president pro tempore.

U.S. House of Representatives

Elections

2006 

When Vermont's U.S. Representative, Bernie Sanders, ran for the U.S. Senate in 2006, Welch chose to run for Sanders's seat. He defeated Republican Martha Rainville in the general election, 53% to 45%, in a race where both candidates pledged to be entirely positive. Welch was the first Democrat to represent Vermont in the House since 1961, and only the second since 1853 (though Sanders, an independent, caucused with the Democrats).

2008 

Welch was re-elected in 2008 with no major-party opposition, becoming the first Democrat to be reelected to the House from Vermont since 1848.  He was in the unusual position of being both the Democratic and Republican nominee for the seat, due to Republican voters writing his name in on the blank primary ballot.

2010 

Welch was reelected with 64% of the vote against Republican nominee Paul Beaudry, Liberty Union nominee Jane Newton, Working Families nominee Sheila Coniff, and independent candidate Gus Jaccaci.

2012 

Welch defeated Republican nominee Mark Donka, Liberty Union candidate Jane Newton, and Independent candidates James "Sam" Desrochers and Andre LaFramboise with 72% of the vote.

2014 

Welch was reelected to a fifth term with 64.4% of the vote, defeating Republican Mark Donka, Matthew Andrews of the Liberty Union Party and Independents Cris Ericson, Randall Meyer and Jerry Trudell.

2016 

Welch ran unopposed in the Democratic primary, and also got more votes in the Republican primary than any other candidate, with 4.51% via write-ins. He defeated Liberty Union candidate Erica Clawson in the general election with 90% of the vote to Clawson's 10%.

2018 

Welch was reelected to a seventh term with 69.2% of the vote, defeating Republican nominee Anya Tyino, Cris Ericson of the Marijuana Party, and Laura Potter of the Liberty Union Party.

2020 

Welch was reelected to an eighth term with 67.3% of the vote, defeating Republican nominee Miriam Berry and Independent candidate Peter Becker.

Tenure

One area where Welch was at odds with vocal constituents was the matter of the impeachment of President George W. Bush and Vice President Dick Cheney. Welch said that ending the Iraq War was a top priority, and impeachment would distract Congress from addressing that outcome. Advocates of impeachment protested at Welch's Vermont offices.

Welch worked with former House Majority Leader Eric Cantor on a bill to increase funding at the National Institutes of Health for pediatric research and with Representative Paul Ryan to reverse proposed regulations that would have banned the use of wooden shelves for ageing cheese wheels. He touts his bipartisanship and describes himself as "very independent". He bucked his party leadership by voting against arming and training Syrian rebels and opposes "boots on the ground" in dealing with ISIL. He believes climate change is a "glaring problem", opposed travel bans in response to the Ebola epidemic and supports immigration reform that addresses border concerns but does not close them.

In his first term, Welch attracted attention for his partnership with Senator Charles Grassley in challenging colleges and universities with substantial endowments to spend more of those funds on operating expenses (including, perhaps, lower tuition).

On February 19, 2016, Welch endorsed Bernie Sanders for the Democratic nomination for president. He endorsed him again in 2020.

During the first impeachment of Donald Trump, Welch invited Trump to testify before the House Permanent Select Committee on Intelligence in response to Jim Jordan's criticism of the impeachment. Welch spoke directly after Jordan, saying, "I say to my colleague, I'd be glad to have the person who started it all come in and testify", adding, "President Trump is welcome to take a seat right there." On December 18, 2019, Welch voted for both articles of impeachment against Trump.

Committee assignments
In the 110th Congress, Welch was a member of the Committee on Rules and the Committee on Oversight and Government Reform.

In the 111th Congress, Welch served on the Committee on Energy and Commerce, the Committee on Oversight and Government Reform, and the Committee on Standards of Official Conduct.

In the 112th Congress, Welch was a member of the Committee on Agriculture and the Committee on Oversight and Government Reform. Beginning with the 112th Congress, he also served as a Chief Deputy Whip, one of several who are part of Democratic Whip Steny Hoyer's organization for managing legislation and votes on the House floor.

During the 113th, 114th, 115th, 116th, and 117th Congresses, Welch was a member of the House Committee on Oversight and Government Reform and the House Committee on Energy and Commerce.
 Committee on Energy and Commerce
 Subcommittee on Energy and Power
 Subcommittee on Digital Commerce and Consumer Protection
 Subcommittee on Communications and Technology
Permanent Select Committee on Intelligence
Subcommittee on Counterterrorism, Counterintelligence and Counterproliferation
Subcommittee on Defense Intelligence and Warfighter Support
 Committee on Oversight and Government Reform
 Subcommittee on National Security

Caucus memberships
 Climate Solutions Caucus
 Congressional Arts Caucus
 Congressional Biomass Caucus (co-chair)
 Congressional Dairy Farmers Caucus (co-chair and founder)
 Congressional NextGen 9-1-1 Caucus
 Congressional Progressive Caucus
Medicare for All Caucus
 Safe Climate Caucus

U.S. Senate

Elections

2022 

On November 15, 2021, incumbent Patrick Leahy announced that he would not seek reelection in the 2022 U.S. Senate election. Welch was considered a possible contender for the seat. On November 22, Welch announced his candidacy to succeed Leahy. He won the Democratic primary by a large margin, and defeated Republican nominee Gerald Malloy in the general election.

Political positions

Gun control
Welch supports gun control. Welch is a supporter of a national assault weapons ban.

LGBTQIA+ rights
Welch supports transgender rights and supports gender affirming care for youth that identify as transgender.

Personal life
Welch is married to Margaret Cheney, a former member of the Vermont House of Representatives who was appointed to the Vermont Public Service Board in 2013. His first wife, Joan Smith, died of cancer in 2004. Welch has five stepchildren from his first marriage and three from his second.

References

External links

 Senator Peter Welch official U.S. Senate website
 Peter Welch for Vermont campaign website
 
 

1947 births
20th-century American politicians
21st-century American politicians
American Roman Catholics
Candidates in the 1990 United States elections
Catholics from Massachusetts
Catholics from Vermont
College of the Holy Cross alumni
Democratic Party members of the United States House of Representatives from Vermont
Living people
Politicians from Springfield, Massachusetts
Presidents pro tempore of the Vermont Senate
Progressivism in the United States
Public defenders
UC Berkeley School of Law alumni
Vermont lawyers
Vermont state senators